Agrostistachys is a plant genus of the family Euphorbiaceae first described as a genus in 1850. It is native to Southeast Asia, New Guinea, India, and Sri Lanka.

Species
 Agrostistachys borneensis Becc. - India, Sri Lanka, Thailand, Vietnam, Malaysia, Borneo, Philippines, Sumatra, New Guinea
 Agrostistachys gaudichaudii Müll.Arg. - Thailand, Peninsular Malaysia
 Agrostistachys hookeri (Thwaites) Benth. & Hook.f. - Sri Lanka
 Agrostistachys indica Dalzell - India, Sri Lanka, Thailand, Vietnam, Myanmar, Laos, Cambodia, Malaysia, Borneo, Philippines, New Guinea
 Agrostistachys sessilifolia (Kurz) Pax & K.Hoffm.  - Peninsular Malaysia, Borneo, Sumatra
 Agrostistachys staminodiata Sevilla - Sumatra

formerly included
moved to other genera (Pseudagrostistachys Tannodia Wetria )

References

Agrostistachydeae
Euphorbiaceae genera
Taxa named by Nicol Alexander Dalzell